Nicolas Meitinger (born 10 February 1984) is a German professional golfer.

Career
Meitinger was born in Cologne, Germany. He turned professional in 2005 and initially played on the EPD Tour, where he had six wins. After finishing third on the EPD Tour Order of Merit in 2008, and subsequently reaching the final stage of the European Tour's Qualifying School, he earned a place on the second-tier Challenge Tour for the first time. In his first season on the tour he recorded two top-10 finishes and ended 70th on the money list, a position he improved on by a single place in 2010. In 2011 he won for the first time on the Challenge Tour. He had further wins on the Pro Golf Tour in 2014 and 2015.

Professional wins (12)

Challenge Tour wins (1)

Challenge Tour playoff record (1–0)

Pro Golf Tour wins (10)

*Note: The 2014 Sueno Pines Classic was shortened to 36 holes due to weather.

Other wins (1)
2008 German PGA Championship

References

External links

German male golfers
European Tour golfers
Sportspeople from Cologne
1984 births
Living people